Felistas Muzongondi (born 22 March 1986) is a Zimbabwean association football player. She is a member of the Zimbabwe women's national football team and represented the country in their Olympic debut at the 2016 Summer Olympics.

References

Zimbabwe women's international footballers
Footballers at the 2016 Summer Olympics
Olympic footballers of Zimbabwe
Living people
1986 births
Zimbabwean women's footballers
Sportspeople from Masvingo
Women's association football forwards